The House of Kalākaua, or Kalākaua Dynasty, also known as the Keawe-a-Heulu line, was the reigning family of the Kingdom of Hawaiʻi between the assumption of King David Kalākaua to the throne in 1874 and the overthrow of Queen Liliʻuokalani in 1893. Liliʻuokalani died in 1917, leaving only cousins as heirs. The House of Kalākaua was descended from chiefs on the islands of Hawaiʻi and Kauaʻi, and ascended to the royal throne by election when the males of the House of Kamehameha died out. The torch that burns at midday symbolizes the dynasty, based on the sacred kapu Kalākaua's ancestor High Chief Iwikauikaua.

Origin 
The dynasty was founded by Kalākaua but included his brothers and sisters who were children of High Chiefess Analea Keohokālole and High Chief Caesar Kaluaiku Kapaʻakea. Through Kapaʻakea's  paternal grandmother Alapa'iwahine he was great-great-grandson of Chief Keaweʻīkekahialiʻiokamoku the great-grandfather (through another son) of Kamehameha I. Through Kapaʻakea's paternal grandfather Kepoʻokalani (who was also Analea's grandfather) he was descended from one of the nīʻaupiʻo royal twins Kameʻeiamoku. Analea was great-great-granddaughter of Chief Keaweʻīkekahialiʻiokamoku on her mother Kamaʻeokalani's side and on her father ʻAikanaka's  father and mother's side she was descended from High Chief Haʻae-a-Mahi, the father of Kekuʻiʻapowa (the mother of Kamehameha). Also on her father's side she was descended from Keawe-a-Heulu. Many of their ancestors were collateral cousins of King Kamehameha I.

Fall of the House of Kalākaua 
With the deposition of Queen Liliʻuokalani in 1893 the House of Kalākaua ceased to reign, and the death of the Princess Victoria Kaʻiulani in 1899 meant the loss of the last direct heir of the siblings of the reigning monarchs of House of Kalākaua. The main line of the dynasty thus ended when the deposed Queen Liliʻuokalani (who had abdicated and renounced) died in 1917. Their cousins came to be known as the House of Kawānanakoa, a branch of the House of Kalākaua, since they are relatives of King Kalākaua, descended from Prince David Kawānanakoa, eldest son of the princess Kūhiō Kinoike Kekaulike, who had died in 1908. The House of Kawānanakoa survives to modern times and at least two of its members have claims to the throne should the Hawaiian monarchy be revived.

Members 
 King Kalākaua (1836–1891)
 Queen Liliʻuokalani (1839–1917)
 Crown Princess Victoria Kaʻiulani (1875–1899)
 Crown Prince William Pitt Leleiohoku (1854–1877)
 Princess Miriam Likelike (1851–1887)
 Princess Kaʻiminaʻauao (1845–1848)
 Prince James Kaliokalani (1835–1852)
 High Chief Caesar Kapaʻakea (1815–1866)
 High Chiefess Analea Keohokālole (1816–1869)

References

External links 
 KALAKAUA AND LILIUOKALANI'S GENEALOGY
 The Royal Family of Hawaii Official Site Kalakaua Chart

 
House of Līloa